Sea and Coast is a worldwide monthly maritime magazine / journal published from New Delhi, India. Focusing on maritime news, including coverage of naval, coastal, ferry, sail and cruise sectors. It is an online and print magazine also available on mobile App Store for Android. Sea and Coast is the official media partner of Indian Navy's Think Tank National Maritime Foundation and SAMDES Society for Aerospace Maritime and Defence Studies.

Background
Sea and Coast maritime magazine / Journal was founded in 2016 by an ex Mariner Amit Kumar.

Sea and Coast covers all aspects of living by the sea: maritime, shipping, offshore, oil and gas, and naval news. The magazine is registered under Ministry of Information and Broadcasting (India) with its RNI  (Registrar of the Newspapers for India, more popularly known as Registrar of Newspapers for India, is a Government of India statutory body of Ministry of Information and Broadcasting for the registration of the publications, such as newspapers and magazines) NO: DELENG/2017/70663.

The publication is distributed in India, Malaysia, Canada, Singapore, Sri Lanka, Italy, Iran, Greece, Israel, Venezuela, UAE, USA, South Africa, Kazakhstan, Spain, Vietnam, Turkey and Belgium.

In 2021, Sea and Coast signed a Memorandum of Understanding (MOU) with SamDes (Society for Aerospace Maritime and Defence Studies), a non-profit think tank of India.

Advisory board
Robin K. Dhowan (Admiral Indian Navy and former Navy chief of India)
Jayanath Colombage (Former Navy chief of Sri Lanka)
Shekhar Dutt (Former governor of Chhattisgarh, India)
Radhika Menon (First female captain of the Indian Merchant Navy)
Dr. Malini V. Shankar (Vice Chancellor Indian Maritime University and Chairman of National Shipping Board) former Director General of Shipping (Ministry of ports, shipping and waterways)
Colonel Rohit Dev, defense expert and media personality
Dr. Eyal Pinko. (Navy Commander, retired) 
Dr. Patrick Verhoeven : Managing Director, International Association For Ports And Harbours (IAPH)
Suneeti Bala (India's first female merchant navy Chief Engineer)

References

External links
 Official website
 
 

News magazines published in India
Magazines established in 2016
2016 establishments in Delhi
Maritime magazines
Business magazines published in India